What A Nuisance (1978–2005) was a New Zealand-bred Thoroughbred  racehorse. He was best known for winning the Melbourne Cup at Flemington Racecourse in November 1985.

Background
What A Nuisance was a bay horse with a white sock on his right hind foot bred in New Zealand by. He was sired by St Puckle, a British-bred son of the 1960 Epsom Derby winner St. Paddy. His dam, Fashion Bell was a descendant of The Witch, a British mare who was exported to Australia in the late 19th century, becoming the grand-dam of the 1902 Melbourne Cup winner The Victory.

Racing career
In early 1984 What A Nuisance, trained by Ken Rogerson won four consecutive races and was made favourite for the Sydney Cup in April despite being treated for a leg injury on the eve of the race. The gelding finished sixth in the race, aggravating the injury. What A Nuisance had recently been one of a group of fifteen horses bought from Rogerson's stable by the businessman Lloyd Williams who along with Dennis Gowing co-owned the gelding for the remainder of his racing career. Williams had previously owned the 1981 Melbourne Cup winner Just A Dash. Attempts to bring What A Nuisance back in the spring failed, as he developed problems with his suspensory ligaments and was kept off the racecourse for a further nine months. He was then sent to be trained by John Meagher.

In the winter of 1985, What a Nuisance returned to racing at Bendigo where he ran five times, winning once. He then finished second to Black Knight at Moonee Valley Racecourse in September and then finished sixth in the Group 1 Caulfield Stakes. He completed his Cup preparation by running fourth in the Moonee Valley Cup and fifth in the Mackinnon Stakes.

At Flemington Racecourse on 5 November What A Nuisance started at odds of 15/1 in a field of twenty-three runners for the Melbourne Cup. The race was sponsored for the first time by the Foster's Group and carried record prize-money of over A$1,000,000, making it the most valuable race ever run in Australia. The race attracted a crowd of 79,126 which included the Prince and Princess of Wales. Ridden by the veteran Pat Hyland, What A Nuisance was drawn badly but appeared well-suited by the wet conditions. Hyland allowed the gelding to relax in the early stages before producing a strong late run to win by a nose from the mare Koiro Corrie May.

Retirement
What A Nuisance was retired to Hyland's property at Clyde, near Cranbourne, Victoria. He  died suddenly on 19 April 2005 at the age of 26. An emotional Hyland described him as "a truly honest and game racehorse".

Pedigree

What A Nuisance was inbred 3 × 4 to Aureole, meaning that this stallion appears in both the third and fourth generations of his pedigree.

Namesake
Australian rail operator CFCL Australia named locomotive FL220 after the horse.

References

1978 racehorse births
2005 racehorse deaths
Melbourne Cup winners
Racehorses bred in New Zealand
Racehorses trained in Australia
Thoroughbred family 1-o